Winfield M. "Win" Kelly Jr. (born September 2, 1935) served as the County Executive of Prince George's County, Maryland from 1974 to 1978. He had previously served as a member of the Board of County Commissioners in Prince George's County, 1970–71, the Chair of the County Council in Prince George's County, 1971–74 and is a former president, Business and Industry Advisory Council, Prince George's County School System. He later served as the Secretary of State of Maryland in the administration of William Donald Schaefer from 1987 to 1993.

Early life and education
Born in Prince George's County, Kelly while in his teens owned a restaurant and a chain of mobile food stands. He began college while County Executive, and later graduated from the University of Maryland, College Park and completed graduate studies at Johns Hopkins University.

Business career
Before entering politics, Kelly started a business while in his teens called Winnie's Chuck Wagon. Starting with one truck, he eventually owned a 150-vehicle fleet and employed 500. Kelly sold the business in 1968.

In addition to his political career, Kelly worked for Storer Cable, WMK Inc. and Prime Cable starting in 1979. He served as the President of Prime Cable of Maryland, 1985–88, the chair of the board of directors and chief executive officer of the Dimensions Healthcare System, 1985–2003. Dimensions Healthcare System formed in 1982 as a not-for-profit healthcare system serving county residents and was the largest provider of healthcare in Prince George's County. Kelly has also worked as the chair and chief executive officer of the Columbia Bancorp and Columbia Bank, is a former director of the First American Bank of Maryland, and is a former chair and chief executive officer, Suburban Bank.

Personal life and community service
Kelly's family owns an automobile dealership with his name in Clarksville, Maryland. His service in community organizations includes his membership with the Prince George's Community College Foundation, the Healthcare Reform Task Force, Maryland Hospital Association, Maryland Chamber of Commerce, Prince George's County Chamber of Commerce, American Cancer Society, Apartment/Office Building Association, Kiwanis Club, Knights of Columbus, Prince George's Jaycees, and Lions Club, and work as a lector and cantor at St. Jerome's Catholic Church in Hyattsville, Maryland. Kelly is married, with seven children, and ten grandchildren.

References

External links
 

Prince George's County, Maryland Executives
Secretaries of State of Maryland
University of Maryland, College Park alumni
Johns Hopkins University alumni
1935 births
Living people
Maryland Democrats